The Laysan dropseed noctuid moth (Hypena laysanensis) was a species of moth in the family Erebidae. The species was first described by Otto Herman Swezey in 1914. This species is now extinct.

This moth was endemic to Laysan Island, one of the outlying Hawaiian Islands of the United States.

The larvae have been recorded on Sporobolus species.

References

Laysan Extinct species

Endemic moths of Hawaii
Extinct Hawaiian animals
Extinct moths
Natural history of the Northwestern Hawaiian Islands
Extinct insects since 1500
Taxonomy articles created by Polbot